The City of Prague Museum is located in Prague, Czech Republic. Langweil's Model of Prague is exhibited in the main building of the museum.

Museum buildings include: Main Building, Podskalí Custom House at Výtoň, Ctěnice Chateau, Prague Towers, House at the Golden Ring, and Architectural Triangle.

See also

 List of museums in Prague

References

External links
 

City museums
Museums in Prague
New Town, Prague